Train Song may refer to:

 "Train Song", a song and 1966 single a-side by Vashti Bunyan
 "The Train Song", a 1969 single by The Flying Burrito Brothers
 "Train Song" by Pentangle from their 1969 album Basket of Light
 "Train Song", a song by Phish from the 1996 album Billy Breathes
 "Train Song", a song by Tom Waits from his 1987 album Franks Wild Years

See also
 Any number of songs about trains
 "Play a Train Song", by Todd Snider from the 2004 album East Nashville Skyline
 
 Trainsong, a 1988 novel by Jan Kerouac